Ivanice is a village and municipality in the Rimavská Sobota District of the Banská Bystrica Region of southern Slovakia.

History
Ivanice is mentioned in 1245. It belonged to the yeomanry families of Széchy and Koháry, later to the Coburg family. Within the years 1796 – 1797 a reformed church was built up. In the interior there are two commemorative boards of fallen during the I. and II. World War. In 1858 almost the whole village burnt out. Thanks to gift from the count Andrássy there was a church school built up in 1906. In the area of the village unused termal spring arises.

Genealogical resources

The records for genealogical research are available at the state archive "Statny Archiv in Banska Bystrica, Slovakia"

 Roman Catholic church records (births/marriages/deaths): 1787-1895 (parish B)

See also
 List of municipalities and towns in Slovakia

External links
https://web.archive.org/web/20071027094149/http://www.statistics.sk/mosmis/eng/run.html
http://www.ivanice.gemer.org
Surnames of living people in Ivanice

Villages and municipalities in Rimavská Sobota District